The British Transport Docks Board (BTDB) was a nationalised industry, managing former railway-owned docks in Great Britain.  It was created by the Transport Act 1962 and abolished by the Transport Act 1981, which provided for its privatisation as Associated British Ports.

The business had its origins in the ports developed or acquired by the private railway companies.  These passed to the British Transport Commission on nationalisation in 1948 and were organised under its Docks and Inland Waterways Executive.

The Transport Act 1962 abolished the Commission and distributed its assets to five successor bodies.  The BTDB inherited the dock undertakings, other than harbours used primarily by railway steamer services.

The BTDB was among the first nationalised industries to be privatised by the Conservative government of Margaret Thatcher.

See also
 Associated British Ports

Sources
 Whitaker's Almanack (various dates)

Former nationalised industries of the United Kingdom
1962 establishments in the United Kingdom
1981 disestablishments in the United Kingdom
British Transport Commission